This is a list of notable alumni of Brisbane State High School.

Business
Michael Bryce – Class of 1955 – Principal Design Advisor to the Sydney Olympic Games; husband of Quentin Bryce
Robin Gibson – Class of 1947 – architect noted for designing QPAC, the Queensland Art Gallery, the State Library, the Queensland Museum and Queen Street Mall
John Lazarou – Class of 1978 – one of the owners of The Coffee Club
Andrew Liveris – Class of 1971 – CEO Dow Chemicals, Co-Chair of President Obama's Advanced Manufacturing Partnership; selected by President Donald Trump to head the American Manufacturing Council
Paul Morgan – Class of 1964 – Co-founder of the Brisbane Broncos 
Katie Page – Class of 1973 – CEO of Harvey Norman; co-owner of the Magic Millions; first woman elected to the board of the National Rugby League
Ed Tweddell – CEO, F.H. Faulding & Co.
Chris Wallin – Class of 1969 – businessman
Graeme Wood – Class of 1964 – co-founder and Executive Director of wotif.com; 2008 Queenslander of the Year

Education
Paul Memmott – Class of 1966 – architect, anthropologist and academic

Entertainment, media and the arts
Jessica Anderson – novelist
Ray Barrett – Class of 1942 – actor
Gordon Bennett – artist
Paul Bishop – Class of 1984 – actor and Councillor for Redland City
John Blight – Class of 1931 – poet
Carol Burns – Class of 1964 – actor
Laurence Collinson – playwright, actor, poet, journalist, and secondary school teacher
Barry Creyton – Class of 1955 – actor and playwright
Brett Dean – Class of 1978 – composer
Paul Dean – Class of 1983 – clarinetist
Diana Doherty – Class of 1983 – Oboist
Penny Downie – Class of 1970 – actress
Jackie French AM – Class of 1970 – author; Senior Australian of the Year 2015
Neil Johnson – Class of 1984 – film and music video producer, editor and director
Luke Haralampou – Class of 2000 – slam poet
Becky Lucas – Class of 2006 – comedian, writer and presenter
Fintan Magee – Class of 2000 – street artist
Tahu Matheson – Class of 1993 – classical pianist and conductor
Matt Okine – Class of 2003 – comedian, actor and radio host
Charles Osborne – Class of 1943 – journalist, theatre and opera critic, poet and novelist
John Peart – Junior Class of 1961 – artist
Barrett Reid – Class of 1943 – librarian, poet and literary editor
William Robinson – Class of 1951 – artist, twice winner of the Archibald Prize
Lillian Roxon – Class of 1948 – author and journalist
Donald Shanks – Class of 1956 – bass-baritone singer
Christopher Sommers – Class of 1994 – actor
Patrick Thomas – Class of 1949 – conductor
Avra Velis – singer-songwriter
Liam Young – Class of 1996 – film director and architect

Governance and politics
Len Ardill – Labor MLA for Salisbury (1986-1992) and Archerfield (1992-1998)
Chris Bombolas – Class of 1978 – Labor MLA for Chatsworth; former Channel 9 sports presenter and reporter
Fred Campbell – Class of 1925 – Liberal MLA for Aspley
Max Chandler-Mather – Class of 2009 – Australian politician and trade unionist
Mal Colston – Class of 1955 – Australian Labor Party senator representing Queensland 1975-1999
Manfred Cross – Class of 1946 – Federal member for Brisbane in the House of Representatives (1961–75, 1980–90)
John Dempsey – Class of 1984 – Queensland Minister for Police and Community Safety
George Georges – Class of 1939 – Labor senator
Bill Hayden – Class of 1949 – 21st Governor-General of Australia; Foreign Affairs Minister 1983-88
Sir Leo Hielscher AC – Class of 1941 – past Head of Queensland Treasury, Head of QIC and QIDC
Alasdair Hutton – Class of 1960 – Member of European Parliament, Author, Narrator
Myer Kangan – Junior Class of 1934 – public servant and educationalist
John-Paul Langbroek – Sub-Senior Class of 1978 – Liberal National MLA for Surfers Paradise – Minister for Education, Training and Employment 2012-2015 – Leader of the Opposition and parliamentary leader of the LNP from 2009 to 2011 
Amy MacMahon – Greens MLA for South Brisbane
Charis Mullen – Class of 1991 – Labor MLA for Jordan (Qld)
Bill O'Chee – Class of 1982 – National Party Senator; Australian Skelton representative at World Cup and World Championships 1998-2002
Lin Powell – Class of 1954 – National MLA for Isis
Guelfi Scassola – Class of 1958 – Liberal MLA for Mt Gravatt
Lyle Schuntner – Class of 1954 – Liberal MLA for Mount Coot-tha
Murray Watt – Class of 1989 – Labor MLA for Everton, Labor Senator for Queensland
Lawrie Willett – Director-General of Health (1983–84); Chancellor of Charles Sturt University (2002–14) 
Jason Woodforth – Class of 1984 – Liberal National MLA for Nudgee

Journalism
Matt Carmichael – Class of 1998 – sports journalist
Jenny Coopes – Junior Class of 1960 – political cartoonist, illustrator and painter
Nick Etchells – Class of 1991 – journalist
Heather Foord – Class of 1982 – journalist
Archer Hamilton – Class of 2008 – former journalist
Edgar George Holt – poet, journalist and public relations officer 
Sylvia Jeffreys – Class of 2003 – journalist and Nine Network presenter
Sandra Sully – Class of 1978 – journalist and Network 10 presenter
Matt Wordsworth – Class of 1991 – journalist

Law
Peter Applegarth – Class of 1975 – Justice of the Supreme Court of Queensland
Glenn Martin – Class of 1972 – Justice of the Supreme Court of Queensland – President, Industrial Court of Queensland

Medicine and science
Paul Glasziou – Class of 1971 – academic physician
Martin Green – Class of 1965 – scientist; Research Director of the University of New South Wales Photovoltaic Centre of Excellence
James Morton – Class of 1982 – medical doctor
 Professor Geoffrey Pryde- Class of 1991- Quantum Physicist, Deputy Director, Centre for Quantum Dynamics, Australia 
Phyllis Fu- Class of 1991- Emergency Physician 
Megan France- Class of 1991- Respiratory and Sleep Medicine Physician
Carlo Yuen- Class of 1991- Urologist

Military
Virgil Brennan – Junior Class of 1934 – flying ace of the Second World War
Ray Funnell – Class of 1952 – Chief of the Air Staff - RAAF 1987 - 1992
Geoff Shepherd – Class of 1969 – Air Marshall; Chief of the RAAF 2005-2008
Douglas Vincent – Class of 1934 – Major General in the Australian Army

Religion
Eva Burrows – Class of 1946 – 13th World Leader of the Salvation Army
Ken Ham – senior science teacher, young-Earth creationist and creator of the Creation Museum in the US
John Mavor – Class of 1951 – minister of religion
David Tribe – Class of 1949 – secularist and humanist

Sport
Many students of the school have gone on to represent Australia at the Olympics and win medals.  More than thirty past students have competed in the Olympics during the school's history, winning numerous bronze, silver and gold medals, some with world records, across a range of sporting disciplines.

Athletics
Naa Anang – Class of 2012 – Australian Long Jumper, Commonwealth Games 2018
Nik Bojic – Class of 2009 – Australian high jumper, Commonwealth Games 2014
Norma Croker – Class of 1952 – Olympian 1956 gold medal, 1960
Cedric Dubler – Class of 2012 – Olympic decathlete 2016, Bronze Medal at the 2018 Commonwealth Games, 3rd Best Australian Decathlete of all time
Marion Hoffman – Class of 1967 – Olympic sprinter 1972, Gold and Bronze Medals at the 1970 Commonwealth Games
Jenny Lund – Australia long-distance runner

Badminton
Wendy Chen – Class of 2010 – Olympian 2016 and 2020

Basketball
Chris Goulding – Class of 2005 – Olympian 2016 – professional basketball player in Australia and Spain
Shyla Heal – Class of 2016 – Australian professional basketball player
Brock Motum – Class of 2007 – Olympian 2016 – professional basketball player in Italy

Cricket
Ian Healy – Class of 1981 – Australian test cricketer, Australian wicket-keeper of the century
Mel Johnson – Class of 1959 – Australian Test cricket match umpire
Michael Kasprowicz – Class of 1989 – Australian test cricketer
Marnus Labuschagne – Class of 2011 – Australian test cricketer
Stuart Law – Year 9 1982 – Australian test cricketer
John Maclean – Class of 1963 – Australian test cricketer
James Peirson – Class of 2009 – Queensland cricketer
Glenn Trimble – Australian ODI cricketer
Jack Wildermuth – Class of 2010 – Brisbane Heat, Queensland and Australian T20 cricketer

Cycling
Stuart Jones – Class of 1986 – Paralympian

Hockey
Fred Quine – Class of 1956 – Olympian 1968 silver medal

Kayaking and canoeing
Lyndsie Fogarty – Class of 2002 – Olympian 2008 bronze medal, 2012

Netball
Peta Stephens – Class of 1995 – Queensland Firebirds Captain

Rowing
Tim Conrad – Class of 1969 – Olympian 1976
Ian Edmunds – Class of 1978 – Olympian 1984 bronze medal
Bo Hanson – Class of 1990 – Olympian 1992, 1996, 2000 & 2004; three bronze medals

Rugby league
Elijah Alick –  Class of 2014 – Brisbane Broncos 
Jay Aston – Class of 2006 – Papua New Guinea Rugby League World Cup Side 2008
Greg Holben –  Class of 1968 – Queensland
Wally Lewis – Class of 1977 – Australian national team captain from 1984 to 1989
Andrew McCullough – Class of 2007 – Brisbane Broncos
Ryan McGoldrick –  Class of 1999 – Cronulla, Castleford Tigers, Hull F.C, USA RL Team
Paul Morgan – Class of 1964 – Queensland
John Plath –  Class of 1986 – Brisbane Broncos
Murray Taulagi – Class of 2016 – North Queensland Cowboys
Will Tupou – Class of 2007 – North Queensland Cowboys

Rugby union
Paul Alo-Emile – Class of 2009 – Samoan International, Melbourne Rebels, Stade Français, Australian U20's,
Mark Bartholomeusz – Class of 1994 – Wallaby, ACT Brumbies
Curtis Browning – Class of 2011 – Queensland Reds
Paul Carozza – Class of 1983 – Wallaby, Queensland Reds
Joel Faulkner – Class of 2009 – Australian U20's
Chris Feauai-Sautia – Class of 2011 – Wallaby, Queensland Reds, Highest capped Australian Schoolboy
Charlie Fetoai – Class of 2005 – Queensland Reds
Peter Hynes – Class of 2000 – Wallaby, Queensland Reds
Simon Kasprowicz – Class of 1994 – Waratah
Mafileo Kefu – Class of 2000 – Tongan International, Toulon
Samu Kerevi –  Class of 2011 – Wallaby, Queensland Reds
Adam Korczyk – Class of 2012 – Queensland Reds
Ryan McGoldrick –  Class of 1999 – New South Wales Waratahs
Peter McLean – Class of 1969 – Wallaby
William McLean – Class of 1933 – Wallaby Captain
Ben Meehan – Class of 2011 – Melbourne Rebels, London Irish
Paul Mooney – Class of 1946 – Wallaby
James Moore – Class of 2010 – Japan International, Sunwolves
David Paice – Class of 2000 – England International, England Saxons, London Irish
Jordan Petaia – Class of 2017 – Wallaby, Queensland Reds, Youngest player to debut for the Qld Reds, Youngest player to debut for the Wallabies in a World Cup
Ed Quirk – Class of 2008 – Wallaby, Queensland Reds
Jacob Rauluni –  Class of 1989 – Fiji Captain, Queensland Reds
Mosese Rauluni –  Class of 1992 – Fiji Captain
Rodney Seib – Class of 1992 – professional rugby union coach
Peter Slattery – Class of 1983 – Wallaby, Queensland Reds
Brian Smith – Class of 1983 – Wallaby and Ireland International, Queensland Reds, Former England Attacking Coach
Patrick Tafa – Class of 2016 – NSW Waratahs
Matt To'omua – Class of 2007 – Wallaby, ACT Brumbies
Tuaina Taii Tualima – Class of 2015 – Queensland Reds
Will Tupou – Class of 2007 – Japan International, Sunwolves
Brando Va'aulu – Class of 2005 – Samoa, Queensland Reds
David Wilson – Class of 1984 – Wallaby

Rugby union 7's
Charlotte Caslick – Class of 2012 – Olympian 2016 gold medal, Women's Rugby sevens player

Sailing
Peter Conde – Class of 1975 – Australian sailor and leading Australian sport administrator

Soccer
Ben Halloran – Class of 2009 – Gold Coast United FC, Brisbane Roar, Fortuna Düsseldorf, Socceroo World Cup 2014 
Chris Harold – Class of 2009 – Gold Coast United FC, Perth Glory
Golgol Mebrahtu – Class of 2007 – Gold Coast United FC, Melbourne Heart

Softball
Marissa Carpadios – Class of 1995 – Olympian 2004 silver medal
Danielle Stewart – Class of 1998 – Olympian 2008

Speed skating
Deanna Lockett – Class of 2013 – speed skater - Olympian 2014

Swimming
Evelina Afoa – Class of 2015 – Olympian 2016 representing Samoa
Duncan Armstrong – Class of 1985 – Olympian 1988 gold and silver medal, 1992
Susie Baumer – Year 10 1981 – Olympian 1984 1988
Jodie Clatworthy – Class of 1989 – Olympian 1988
Brad Cooper – Class of 1971 – Olympian 1972 gold medal
Justin Lemberg – Class of 1983 – Olympian 1984 bronze medal
Hayley Lewis – Class of 1991 – Olympian 1992 silver and bronze medal, 1996
Scott Logan – Class of 1993 – Olympian 1996
Lise Mackie – Class of 1993 – Olympian 1992 1996 bronze medal
Jon Sieben – Class of 1983 – Olympian 1984 gold and bronze medal, 1988, 1992

Tennis
 Mark Draper – Class of 1987 – former professional tennis player from Australia
 Scott Draper – Class of 1991 – Australian Open Mixed Doubles Champion with Samantha Stosur 2005

Triathlon
Rina Hill – Year 9 1983 – Olympian 2004

Volleyball
Jarryd Christensen – Class of 2004 – Australian team member
Zane Christensen – Class of 2002 – Olympian 2004

Water polo
Kate Gynther – Class of 1999 – Olympian 2004, 2008 bronze medal, 2012 bronze medal
Amy Hetzel – Class of 2000 – Olympian 2008 bronze medal

References

Brisbane State High School
Brisbane State High School